Mintel Group Ltd is a global, privately owned market research firm based in London, UK. The corporation also maintains offices in Chicago, Mumbai, Belfast, Shanghai, Tokyo, Sydney, Sao Paulo, Singapore, Kuala Lumpur, Dusseldorf, Bangkok, and Seoul. Mintel databases, analysis, and forecasts are accessible to subscribing clients, those who purchase standalone reports, and to students in participating university libraries.

History

Products
Mintel Comperemedia tracks direct mail and print advertising in the United States and Canada, and email marketing in the United States. This Web-based tool tracks trends and strategies in industries such as credit cards, telecom, banking, insurance, travel and investments. Added in November 2006, Mintel Comperemedia's Email Panel shows emails as they appear in consumers' inboxes. Added in 2010, Mintel Comperemedia tracks online advertising as part of its digital channel.

Mintel Global Market Sizes shares and forecasts data for thousands of consumer goods markets worldwide.

Mintel Global New Products Database (GNPD) is an online database of new fast-moving consumer goods, also known as consumer packaged goods. Over five million records from more than 80 countries provide product ingredients, nutrition facts, packaging, distribution and pricing information.

Added in 2007, Mintel GNPD IRIS allows users to differentiate successful and unsuccessful product launches.

Mintel Menu Insights is a source for trends in the dining experience, menu optimization and new flavors, ingredients and food preparation.

Mintel Reports publishes online reports containing consumer research and analysis; market drivers, size, structure, and segmentation; and market forecasts and is a delivery platform focusing on opinions from Mintel analysts. 

Mintel Trends tracks emerging marketing, social and cultural trends, commenting on areas Mintel believes hold potential for sales success.

Mintel Research Consultancy creates bespoke and confidential research for individual clients, including worldwide product retrieval, quality assurance, retail audits, mystery shopping, category assessment and custom consumer research.

Mintel Beauty & Personal Care offers expert-led solutions, helping you create unique product launches to be the brand of tomorrow. 

Mintel eCommerce Intelligence is the smartest way to understand Beauty and Personal Care digital commerce.

Mintel Household & Personal Care delivers verified data about trends, markets and consumers impacting brand decisions for the future.

Mintel ePerformance tracks and assesses email marketing campaigns and their performance to provide competitive and industry benchmarks.

Mintel Field Services delivers the on-the-ground intelligence brands need to inform sales strategies and monitor competitors.

Mintel Food & Drink is market data, trend tracking and consumer analysis on the food and drink industry.

Mintel Purchase Intelligence supplies benchmarks to unlock the attributes driving purchase decisions.

References

External links
 Official Company Website
 Mintel Reports Store
 Mintel Reports Store - Germany

Companies based in the City of London
Market research companies of the United Kingdom
Market research companies of the United States
British companies established in 1972
Business services companies established in 1972
Research and analysis firms of the United Kingdom
1972 establishments in England